The Battle of Prek Klok may refer to one of two battles during Operation Junction City in the Vietnam War:
Battle of Prek Klok I
Battle of Prek Klok II